Vlado Fumić (born 5 April 1956) is a Yugoslav former cyclist. He competed in the sprint and 1000m time trial events at the 1976 Summer Olympics.

References

External links
 

1956 births
Living people
Yugoslav male cyclists
Olympic cyclists of Yugoslavia
Cyclists at the 1976 Summer Olympics
Place of birth missing (living people)